Belbeuf is a commune in the Seine-Maritime department in the Normandy region in northern France.

Geography

Population

Places of interest
 The church of Notre-Dame, dating from the sixteenth century.
 A menhir.
 The eighteenth-century château with its dovecote and park.
 The sixteenth-century chapel of Saint-Bonaventure & Saint-Adrien, built around a cave in the cliffs overlooking the river.

Notable people
 Jacques Anquetil, cyclist, lived here in the 1960s.
 Claude Bébéar, businessman, the former CEO of AXA Assurance, lived here.
 Jacques Godart, 6th Marquis de Belbeuf

See also
Communes of the Seine-Maritime department

References

External links

Official town website 
Belbeuf Rowing Club = Club Nautique de Belbeuf  rowing on the Seine, in picturesque surroundings, a few kilometres upstream of Rouen

Communes of Seine-Maritime